Külvar Mand (born 29 May 1965, Paide) is an Estonian politician and anesthesiologist. He was a member of X Riigikogu.

He has been a member of Res Publica Party.

References

Living people
1965 births
Estonian anesthesiologists
Res Publica Party politicians
Members of the Riigikogu, 2003–2007
University of Tartu alumni
People from Paide
21st-century physicians